The Fliegerstaffel 4 (Squadron 4) of the Swiss Air Force, and belonged to the Überwachungsgeschwader with professional military pilots. Their home base at the dissolution was the Payerne Air Base and the Fliegerstaffel 4 was equipped with Mirage IIIRS . The Fliegerstaffel 4 carried as the coat of arms the AMIR badge (AMIR = Aufklärer Mirage  (reconnaissance Mirage)). This badge shows on a white ground a falcon head drawn with black lines, the neck of which is filled with blue color. The beak rises above the round badge, above the head of the falcon is the red number 4. Except for the number 4, the badge is identical to the AMIR badge of the Fliegerstaffel 10 and the Fliegerstaffel 3 (they had a number 10 resp. 3 In the badge).

History 
It was founded in the  Second World War under the designation Fliegerkompanie 4. Starting from 1940, the Fliegerkompanie used 4 aircraft of the type Morane.
From 1943 on the Fliegerkompanie 4 was on duty at  the military airfield Frutigen. In 1945 during a reorganization the flying personal  of the Fliegerkompanie 4 was divided into the newly created Fliegerstaffel 4. From 1954 onwards, the Fliegerstaffel 4 changed to the  De Havilland D.H. 100 Vampire and De Havilland DH-112 Venom. The  Military Airfield St. Stephan became the new home base of the Fliegerstaffel 4.
In 1975 the Hawker Hunter became the new aircraft of the Fliegerstaffel 4 of and the [military airfield Turtmann the new home base.
The Fliegerstaffel 4  passed the Hawker Hunter 1991 to other squadrons and the Fliegerstaffel 4 was temporarily disbanded. In 1992 it was reactivated and  renamed  as Aufklärungsstaffel 4. Now Mirage lllRS were used and the new home base was the Payerne Air Base . During this time, the squadron badge also changes to the AMIR badge.

In the year 2000 the Aufklärerstaffel 4 (reconnaissance squadron 4) was disbanded, and integrated into the Fliegerstaffel 10.

Airplanes 
 Morane D-3801
 de Havilland Vampire 
 de Havilland Venom 
 Hawker Hunter
 Dassault Mirage IIIRS

References

Flieger-Flab-Museum
  Hermann Keist FlSt4
 Christophe Donnet: Hunter fascination. Schück, Adliswil 1995, 
Farbgebung und Kennzeichen der Schweizer Militäraviatik 1914-1950 (Georg Hoch)  

Squadrons of the Swiss Air Force
Military units and formations established in 1940
Military units and formations disestablished in 2000